Nyssodrysternum propinquum is a species of beetle in the family Cerambycidae. It was described by Henry Walter Bates in 1864.

References

Nyssodrysternum
Beetles described in 1864